The 2012 IIHF U18 World Championship Division III was an international under-18 ice hockey tournament organised by the International Ice Hockey Federation. In 2012 was introduced a new format of the IIHF World U18 Championships, therefore Division III now represents the sixth tier of the IIHF World U18 Championships. The Division III tournament was played in Sofia, Bulgaria, from 12 to 18 March 2012.

Participants

Final standings

Results
All times are local. (Eastern European Time – UTC+2)

References

IIHF World U18 Championship Division III
2012 IIHF World U18 Championships
International ice hockey competitions hosted by Bulgaria
World